Mount Bistre is a summit in Alberta, Canada. It was named for its bistre colour.

References

Bistre
Alberta's Rockies